The Myx Music Awards, currently known as the Myx Awards, are accolades presented by the cable channel Myx to honor the biggest hitmakers in the Philippines. The awards ceremony is held annually and occurs most commonly in March, and broadcast delayed on Myx. Myx viewers from all over the Philippines decide the winners in 17 major categories via SMS text messaging by 2010 it is 60% fan votes through internet and 40% artists votes.

Sarah Geronimo has the most wins in the history of the award ceremony.

Ceremonies

Award categories

Competitive awards
Myx Music Award for Favorite Music Video 
Myx Music Award for Favorite Song 
Myx Music Award for Favorite Artist 
Myx Music Award for Favorite New Artist 
Myx Music Award for Favorite Rock Video 
Myx Music Award for Favorite Urban Video 
Myx Music Award for Favorite Mellow Video 
Myx Music Award for Favorite Collaboration 
Myx Music Award for Favorite International Video

Retired awards
Myx Music Award for Favorite Indie Artist 
Myx Music Award for Favorite Myx Live Performance 
Myx Music Award for Favorite K-Pop Video 
Myx Music Award for Favorite Remake 
Myx Music Award for Favorite Male Artist 
Myx Music Award for Favorite Female Artist 
Myx Music Award for Favorite Group 
Myx Music Award for Favorite Media Soundtrack 
Myx Music Award for Favorite Guest Appearance in a Music Video 
Myx Music Award for Favorite Myx Bandarito Performance 
Myx Music Award for Favorite MYX Celebrity VJ

Special awards
Myx Music Award for Myx Magna Award 
Kumu Rising Star of the Year 
Myx Music Award for Best Music Video 
Spotify's Top OPM Hip-Hop Artist 
Myx Music Award for Favorite Ringtone 
Special Citation

Most awarded artist
Sarah Geronimo and Parokya Ni Edgar share the record for most awards won in a single night with six each, in 2009 and 2012 respectively. Overall, Sarah Geronimo is the most awarded nominee in MYX history since the show's inception in 2006.

Myx Magna Awardee
The Myx Magna Award is given annually to honor a music icon's exemplary contribution to the industry.

2006: Sharon Cuneta
2007: APO Hiking Society
2008: Gary Valenciano
2009: Eraserheads
2010: Jose Mari Chan
2011: Regine Velasquez
2012: Ryan Cayabyab
2013: Lea Salonga
2014: Parokya Ni Edgar
2015: Rey Valera
2016: Ogie Alcasid
2017: Vic Del Rosario, Jr.
2018: Martin Nievera
2019: Rivermaya
2020: Francis Magalona (posthumous)
2021: Asin

References

 
Philippine music awards
Awards established in 2006
2006 establishments in the Philippines

Award ceremonies in the Philippines